Edward Grierson (9 March 1914 – 24 May 1975) was a Northumberland barrister and a writer of crime novels. His debut crime novel is the outstanding Reputation for a Song, a classic inverted detective story. Grierson also wrote five novels, six works of non-fiction and two plays. He also wrote as Brian Crowther and John P. Stevenson.

Works
 Crime novels
 Shall Perish with the Sword (as Brian Crowther). London, Quality Press, 1949.
 Reputation for a Song. London, Chatto and Windus, and New York, Knopf, 1952. See also the film My Lover, My Son
 The Second Man. London, Chatto and Windus, and New York, Knopf, 1956. Gold Dagger Award (dramatised on television: 'The Second Man' on Playhouse 90 in 1959 - starred James Mason and Diana Wynyard)
 The Massingham Affair. London, Chatto and Windus, 1962; New York, Doubleday, 1963.
 A Crime of One's Own. London, Chatto and Windus, and New York, Putnam, 1967.

 Novels
 The Lilies and the Bees. London, Chatto and Windus, 1953; as The Hastening Wind, New York, Knopf, 1953; as The Royalist, New York, Bantam, 1956.
 Far Morning. London, Chatto and Windus, and New York, Knopf, 1955.
 The Captain General (as John P. Stevenson). New York, Doubleday, 1956; (as Edward Grierson), London, Chatto and Windus, 1958.
 Dark Torrent of Glencoe. New York, Doubleday, 1960; London, Chatto and Windus, 1961.

 Plays
 His Mother's Son, with Raymond Lulham (produced Harrogate, Yorkshire, 1953).
 Radio plays: The Ninth Legion, 1956; The Second Man, 1956; Mr. Curtis's Chambers, 1959.

 Other
 Storm Bird: The Strange Life of Georgina Weldon. London, Chatto and Windus, 1959.
 The Fatal Inheritance: Philip II and the Spanish Netherlands. London, Gollancz, and New York, Doubleday, 1969.
 The Imperial Dream: The British Commonwealth and the Empire 1775–1969. London, Collins, 1972; as The Death of the Imperial Dream, New York, Doubleday (publisher), 1972.
 Confessions of a Country Magistrate, London, Gollancz, 1972.
 King of the Two Worlds: Philip II of Spain. London, Collins, and New York, Putnam, 1974.
 The Companion Guide to Northumbria. London, Collins, 1976.

1914 births
1975 deaths
British crime fiction writers
20th-century English novelists
People educated at St Paul's School, London